Famous or notable Venezuelans include:

Architecture 

Jimmy Alcock
Esther Ayuso
Federico Beckhoff
Anita Berrizbeitia
 Guido Bermudez
	Bernardo Borges
Dirk Bornhost 
Carlos Brillembourg
Cipriano Dominguez
Julián Ferris Betancourt
José Miguel Galia
Graziano Gasparini
 Carlos Gomez de Llarena
 Alejandro Chataing, known as "Cipriano Castro's architect"
 Luis Eduardo Chataing
Carlos Guinand Sandoz
 Tomas Lugo Marcano
 Juan Hurtado Manrique
Paul Lustgarten
Pedro Neuberger
 Marcos Negron
Luis Malaussena
 Alejandro Pietri
Mónica Ponce de León
José Tomás Sanabria
Manuel Mujica Millán
Jorge Rigamonti (1948–2008)
Luis Roche
Henrique Siso Martin  
 Luis Muñoz Tébar
 Jesus Tenreiro Degwitz
 Carlos Raúl Villanueva (1900–1975), builder of the Ciudad Universitaria de Caracas
Luciano Urdaneta
Martin Vega
José Vivas
Gustavo Wallis Legórburu
Carlos Zapata

Artists 

 Harry Abend (1937–2021)
 Antonio Ladislao Alcantara (1898–1991)
 Gabriel Bracho (1915–1995)
 Manuel Cabré(1890–1984)
 Gregorio Camacho (1933–2002)
 Pedro Castillo (1790–1858) 
 Carlos Cruz-Díez (born 1923)
 Mariano Díaz (born 1929)
 Marisol Escobar (1930–2016)
 Mateo Manaure (1926–2018)
 Arturo Michelena (1863–1898)
 Alirio Palacios (1938–2015)
 Gego (1912–1994)
 Juvenal Ravelo (born 1941)
 Tito Salas (1887–1974)
 Jesus Rafael Soto (1923–2005)
 Martín Tovar y Tovar (1827–1902)

Authors

A–C 

 Cecilio Acosta, writer
Laura Antillano, writer
 Jean Aristeguieta, poet
 José Antonio de Armas Chitty, historian and poet
 Rafael Arráiz Lucca, historian and poet
Enriqueta Arvelo Larriva, poet
 Alberto Arvelo Torrealba, poet
Michaelle Ascencio, writer
 José Balza, writer
 Rufino Blanco Fombona, poet and writer
 Alberto Barrera Tyszka, writer
 Natividad Barroso, writer and ethnologist
 Andrés Bello, educator and humanist
Krina Ber, writer
 Andrés Eloy Blanco, poet
 Eduardo Blanco, novelist and poet
 Mario Briceño Iragorry (1897–1958), writer and historian
 Manuel Caballero, historian and journalist
 Rafael Cadenas, poet
María Calcaño, poet
 Juan Carlos Chirinos, writer
 Luis Castro Leiva, academic, historian and writer
Sonia Chocrón, poet

D–M 
 Victoria de Stefano, writer
Manuel Díaz Rodríguez, novelist and journalist
Lydda Franco Farías, poet
 Tulio Febres Cordero, writer
María Antonieta Flores, poet
 Rómulo Gallegos, writer
 Julio Garmendia, writer and journalist
 Salvador Garmendia, novelist and story teller
Jacqueline Goldberg, poet and writer
 Adriano González León, poet and writer
Ida Gramcko, poet
Elisa Lerner, writer
 Francisco Herrera Luque (1927–1991), writer
Rowena Hill, poet
 Eduardo López Bustamante, journalist and poet
Luz Machado, poet
Antonieta Madrid, writer
 Francisco Massiani, writer
Milagros Mata Gil, writer
 Domingo Maza Zavala, journalist and economist
 Juan Carlos Méndez Guédez, writer
Beatriz Mendoza Sagarzazu, poet
 Guillermo Meneses (1911–1978), writer and journalist
 Eugenio Montejo (1938–2008), poet
 Guillermo Morón, historian and writer
Stefania Mosca, writer

N–P 

 Moisés Naím, writer
 Fabricio Ojeda, journalist and writer
 Juan Oropeza, writer
 Hanni Ossott, poet
Edgar C. Otálvora, journalist and writer
 Miguel Otero Silva, writer
Antonia Palacios, writer
Lucila Palacios, writer
María Fernanda Palacios, writer
Ramón Palomares, poet
 Yolanda Pantin, poet
 Teresa de la Parra, writer
 Juan Antonio Pérez Bonalde, poet
 Mariano Picón Salas, writer
 José Rafael Pocaterra, writer
 Carlos Rangel, journalist and writer
Ana María del Re, poet

S–Z 
 Tomás Straka, historian
 José Antonio Ramos Sucre, poet
 Oscar Sambrano Urdaneta, writer and literary critic
Juan Sánchez Peláez, poet
Elizabeth Schön, writer
 Pedro Sotillo, writer and journalist
Tui T. Sutherland, writer
Mireya Tabuas, writer
Ana Enriqueta Terán, poet
 Alfredo Toro Hardy, writer and diplomat
Ana Teresa Torres, writer
 Arturo Uslar Pietri, historian and writer
Lucila Velásquez, poet and journalist
Elena Vera, poet
Carmen Verde Arocha, poet
Miyó Vestrini, journalist, poet and writer
 José Jesús Villa Pelayo, poet and essayist 
 Slavko Zupcic, writer

Beauty queens 
The following Venezuelans won a beauty title in the Big Four international beauty pageants: Miss Universe, Miss World, Miss International and Miss Earth; the four major international beauty pageants for women.

A–H 
 Consuelo Adler, Miss International 1997
 Jacqueline Aguilera, Miss World 1995, Top Model of the World 1995
 Goizeder Azúa, Miss International and Miss Mesoamérica 2003
 Alexandra Braun, Miss Earth 2005
 Susana Duijm (1936–2016), Miss World 1955
 Stefanía Fernández, Miss Universe 2009 
 Daniela di Giacomo, Miss International 2006
 Alyz Henrich, Miss Earth 2013
 Astrid Carolina Herrera, Miss World 1984

I–M 

 Gabriela Isler, Miss Universe 2013
 Ninibeth Leal, Miss World 1991
 Pilín León, Miss World 1981
 Alicia Machado, Miss Universe 1996
 Dayana Mendoza, Miss Universe 2008
 Edymar Martínez, Miss International 2015

O–R 
 Bárbara Palacios, Miss Universe 1986 and Miss South America 1986

S–Y 
 Irene Sáez, Miss Universe 1981 and Miss South America 1981
 Ivian Sarcos, Miss World 2011
 Maritza Sayalero, Miss Universe 1979
 Nina Sicilia, Miss International 1985
 Vivian Urdaneta, Miss International 2000 
Mariem Velazco, Miss International 2018

Business and law 
 Gustavo Cisneros, Venezuelan-born media mogul. He is among the world's richest men according to Forbes magazine, which estimates his fortune at $6 billion.
 Manuel Antonio Matos, banker and caudillo
 Lorenzo Mendoza Fleury, co-founder of oversees one of Venezuela's largest private companies, $6 billion (sales) Empresas Polar.
 Eugenio Mendoza (1906–1979), Venezuelan business tycoon who made important contributions in the modernization of the country during the 20th Century.
 Henry Lord Boulton, Venezuelan aviator, entrepreneur, owner, and former owner of many businesses such as Casas Boulton, Avensa/Servivensa among others.
 Ali Lenin Aguilera, Venezuelan lawyer, entrepreneur
 Carolina Herrera, fashion designer and entrepreneur who founded her eponymous company in 1980.
Lorenzo Mendoza(born 1965), actual owner of Empresas Polar
 Rostislav Ordovsky-Tanaevsky Blanco, entrepreneur, president of Rostik Group in Russia
 William H. Phelps, Jr., ornithologist and founder of Radio Caracas Televisión
 William H. Phelps, ornithologist and founder of Radio Caracas Radio
 Carlos Eduardo Stolk (1912–1995), founding member of the United Nations, Chairman of the Board and President of Empresas Polar.
Miguel Urdaneta Fernández, founder of SBA Airlines
Luis Emilio Velutini (born 1953), businessman and investor of the Latin American financial and real estate market
Juan Antonio Yanes, executive in Venezuelan Professional Baseball League who owned the Patriotas de Venezuela franchise
Jean Arvelaez, Top Sales Professional at Germain Ford

Cartoonists 
 Jorge Blanco
 Pedro León Zapata

Diplomats
Alejo Fortique
Juan García Gruber, ambassador in Nicaragua
 Jose Rafael Revenga, ambassador 
 Carlos Alberto Taylhardat, ambassador to Iraq and Lebanon

Engineering 
 Cristina Amon, Dean, Faculty of Applied Science and Engineering, University of Toronto
Francisco de Paula Andrade Troconis
Jacqueline Faría
Salomón Cohen Levy
 José González-Lander, engineer, head engineer for the Metro de Caracas (1993–2000)
 Alfredo Jahn, engineer and naturalist
María Corina Machado
 L. Rafael Reif, engineer, President of MIT
Keysi Sayago
Leopoldo Sucre Figarella

Entertainment

A–D 
 Mayra Alejandra, television and film actress
 María Conchita Alonso, Cuban-born Venezuelan raised actress and singer
 Juan A. Baptista, actor
 José Bardina, Spanish-born Venezuelan actor
 Daniela Alvarado, actress
 Marina Baura, Spanish-born Venezuelan actress
 Amador Bendayán, actor and entertainer
 Marisela Berti, actress, beauty queen and show host
 Alexandra Braun, model
 Jacques Braunstein, Romanian-born Venezuelan radio host
 Maritza Bustamante, actress and model
 Santiago Cabrera, actor
 Camila Canabal, television hostess
 Fernando Carrillo, actor
 Grecia Colmenares, Venezuelan-born Argentine actress
 Francisco José Cróquer, sportscaster and poetic declaimer
 Eliana Cuevas, singer-songwriter
 Guillermo Dávila, actor and singer
 Miguel de León, actor
 Oscar D'León, singer and bandleader
 Majandra Delfino, actress
 Chiquinquirá Delgado, actress and model
 Christina Dieckmann, actress and model
 Kimberly Dos Ramos actress
  Cesar D' La Torre, actor

E–P 
 Eva Ekvall, television hostess
 Gaby Espino, actress
 Maria Gabriela de Faría, actress
 Lele Pons, internet personality and actress
 Lupita Ferrer, actress
 Sandro Finoglio, actor, model
 Catherine Fulop, actress, television host
 Viviana Gibelli, Polish-born Venezuelan television host
 Guillermo Fantástico González, Spanish-born Venezuelan television host
 Scarlet Gruber, actress
 Joselo, actor and comedian
 Cynthia Lander, beauty pageant contestant
 Jean Paul Leroux, actor
Carlos Mata, actor, singer, TV presenter 
 Esperanza Magaz, Cuban-born Venezuelan actress
 Rosmeri Marval, actress, model and singer
 Keidy Moreno, model
 Lila Morillo, actress, singer
 Carlos Montilla, actor, musician
Daniela Navarro, actress, model
 Carlos Olivier, actor
 Alejandro Otero, actor, model
 Renny Ottolina, television host and producer
 Enrique Palacios, model
 Vanessa Pose, actress
 Marianne Puglia, model

R–S 

 Édgar Ramírez, film actor and television producer
 Veruska Ramírez, model
 Benjamín Rausseo (a.k.a. Er Conde del Guácharo), comedian
 Maricarmen Regueiro, actress
 Gustavo Rodríguez, film, stage and television actor
 José Luis Rodríguez (a.k.a. El Puma), singer and actor
 Mariangel Ruiz, actress and model
 Juan Carlos Salazar, singer, musician, composer
 Sabrina Salvador, television host
 Luis José Santander, actor
 Enrique Sapene, actor and television producer
 Daniel Sarcos, television host
 Marger Sealey, singer
 Sabrina Seara, actress
 Eduardo Serrano, actor
 Sonya Smith, American-born Venezuelan actress
 Verónica Schneider, actress and model
 Gabriela Spanic, actress
 Mónica Spear, actress, model
 Natalia Streignard, Spanish-born Venezuelan actress
 Francys Sudnicka, model
 Juana Sujo, Argentinian-born actress and theatrical educator

T–Z 

 Carolina Tejera, actress, model
 Coraima Torres, actress
 Orlando Urdaneta, actor
 Wilmer Valderrama, actor, television host
 Angélica Vale, actress
 Dominika van Santen, model
 Patricia Velásquez, actress, model
 Rita Verreos, beauty pageant contestant
 Doris Wells, actress
 Oscar Yanes, journalist, writer

Filmmakers 
 Elizabeth Avellán (born 1960)
 Román Chalbaud (born 1931)
 Clemente de la Cerda (1935–1984)
 Josiah DonMartin (born 1988)
 Solveig Hoogesteijn (born 1946)
 Jonathan Jakubowicz (born 1978)
 Marcel Rasquin (born 1975)
 Luis Armando Roche (born 1938)
 Mariana Rondon, (born 1966)
 Fina Torres (born 1951)

Historical 

 Simón Bolívar (1783–1830), Wars of Independence leader, military commander, Father of the Nation
 José Tomás Boves (1782–1814), Wars of Independence leader, military caudillo.
 Luisa Cáceres de Arismendi (1799–1866), heroine from the Venezuelan War of Independence
 Pedro Camejo (better known as Negro Primero, or The First Black) (1790–1821), lieutenant at the Venezuelan war of independence.
 Agostino Codazzi (1793–1859), Italian born, military officer, cartographer, former governor of Barinas
 Francisco de Miranda (1750–1816), Wars of Independence leader, veteran of the U.S. and French revolutions.
 Antonio José de Sucre (1795–1830), Wars of Independence leader, Grand Marshal of Ayacucho, president of Bolivia (1826–1828), president of Peru
 Juan José Flores (1800–1864), founder of the Repubilic of Ecuador and its first President
 Pedro Gual Escandón (1783–1862), President of Venezuela in 1858, 1859, and 1861
 Santiago Mariño (1788–1854), hero in the Venezuelan War of Independence, and important leader of Venezuela's eastern.
 Cristóbal Mendoza (1772–1829), considered to be the first President of Venezuela.
 José Gregorio Monagas (1795–1858), hero of the Venezuelan War of Independence, and former president.
 José Tadeo Monagas (1784–1868), hero of the Venezuelan War of Independence, and former president.
 Mariano Montilla (1782–1851), Major General of the Army of Venezuela in the Venezuelan War of Independence
 José Antonio Páez (1790–1873), Wars of Independence leader, former president
 José Félix Ribas (1775–1815), leader and hero of the Venezuelan War of Independence.
 Juan Germán Roscio (1763–1821), lawyer and politician, main editor of the Venezuelan Declaration of Independence and chief architect of the Venezuelan Constitution of 1811.
 Rafael Urdaneta (1788–1845), hero of the Latin American wars of independence.
 Fernando Adames Torres (1837–1910) General of the Army during the Revolution of Coro, Senator representing Lara State and Chief of Staff.
 Fermin Toro (1807–1865), politician, diplomat, writer, minister of Finance and Foreign Affairs, president of the 1858 National Convention.

Mass media 
 Mariana Atencio, journalist, anchor, correspondent 
 Arístides Bastidas, science journalism
 Nelson Bocaranda, political journalist and broadcaster
 Carlos Capriles Ayala, journalist and historian
 Miguel Ángel Capriles Ayala,  journalist and editor
 María Teresa Castillo,  journalist and cultural entrepreneur
 José Agustín Catalá, journalist and author
 Luis Chataing, radio host and humorist
 Simón Alberto Consalvi, journalist, author and politician
 Milena Gimón, sports journalist
 Roberto Giusti, political journalist and broadcaster
 Laureano Márquez, Spanish-born Venezuelan journalist and humorist
 Aníbal Nazoa, journalist and writer
 Aquiles Nazoa, journalist, writer and humorist
 Jorge Olavarría, political journalist and historian
 Rafael Poleo, political journalist and editor
 Abelardo Raidi, sports journalist and broadcaster
 Lil Rodríguez, cultural journalist
 Oscar Yanes, journalist and writer

Mountaineers 
 José Antonio Delgado, first person to summit five eight-thousanders.

Musicians

A–B 
 Adrenalina Caribe, Caribbean music group
 Abraham Abreu, harpsichordist and pianist
 Aldo Abreu, Medieval-Baroque recorder executant
 José Antonio Abreu, classical musician and founder of El Sistema
 Vinicio Adames, choral group conductor
 Francisco de Paula Aguirre, composer
 Ricardo Aguirre, singer-songwriter
 Gustavo Aguado, bandleader, double bassist, co-founder of Guaco
 Luis Alfonzo Larrain, bandleader, arranger, composer
 Los Amigos Invisibles, funk music band
 Diana Arismendi, composer

 Fulgencio Aquino, Venezuelan harp player, composer
 Reynaldo Armas, singer-songwriter
 The Asbestos, rock music band
 Devendra Banhart, American-Venezuelan singer-songwriter
 Huáscar Barradas, flautist, composer
 Édgar Bastidas, lyric tenor
 Carlos Baute, pop singer
 Beatriz Bilbao, composer
 Hugo Blanco, Venezuelan harp player, songwriter
 Modesta Bor, composer, choir conductor
 Soledad Bravo, singer
 Benjamín Brea, Spanish-born Venezuelan musician
 Vytas Brenner, keyboardist, songwriter
 Humberto Bruni Lamanna, classical guitarist
 Andréa Burns, American-born Venezuelan singer

C–D 

 Calle Ciega, reggaeton band
  Andres Carciente, concert pianist
 Candy 66, rock band
 Benito Canónico, composer
 Los Cañoneros, Caraquenian traditional genres group
 Los Cuñaos, traditional eight-part vocal group
 Renato Capriles, bandleader and composer
 Caramelos de Cianuro, rock band
 Ramon Carranza, saxophonist, instructor
 El Carrao de Palmarito (Juan de los Santos Contreras), folk singer
 Teresa Carreño, 19th century pianist
 Evencio Castellanos, classical pianist
 Mirla Castellanos, pop singer
 José Catire Carpio, folk singer
 Inocente Carreño, classical composer, conductor
 Rubén Cedeño, lyric singer
 María Teresa Chacín, folk singer
 Los Chamos, pop group
 Ilan Chester, pop singer-songwriter
 Chino & Nacho, reggaeton duet
 Collegium Musicum de Caracas, classical music group
 Vidal Colmenares, joropo singer
 Sylvia Constantinidis, Venezuelan-born American classical pianist, composer, conductor, also a multimedia artist, writer, music educator
 Guillermo Dávila, pop singer
 Desorden Público, ska band
 Franco De Vita, pop singer-songwriter
 Alirio Díaz, classical guitarist
 Simón Díaz, folk singer-songwriter
 Dimensión Latina, salsa band
 Oscar D'León, salsa singer
 Rubén Domínguez, lyric tenor
 Gustavo Dudamel, classical conductor

E–J 
 Eliana Cuevas, singer-songwriter
 Ensamble Gurrufío, folk instrumental group
 Antonio Estévez, classical composer
 Flor Roffé de Estévez, was a composer, writer, and professor of Venezuelan music
 Pedro Eustache, classical flute player
 Heraclio Fernández, pianist, composer
 Ignacio Figueredo, Venezuelan harp player
 Billo Frómeta, Dominican-born Venezuelan bandleader, songwriter, arranger
 Otilio Galíndez, folk and pop composer
 Hernán Gamboa, Venezuelan cuatro player
 Gran Coquivacoa, Venezuelan gaita group
 Guaco, pop and salsa band
 Pedro Elías Gutiérrez, composer, conductor
 Reynaldo Hahn, Venezuelan-born French classical composer
 Lorenzo Herrera, folk and pop singer-songwriter
 Enrique Hidalgo, folk and pop songwriter
 Cheo Hurtado, Venezuelan cuatro player
 Gualberto Ibarreto, folk and pop singer
 Jorge Isaac, Medieval-Baroque recorder executant
 Adina Izarra, composer
 Jeremías, British-born Venezuelan pop singer-songwriter
 Guillermo Jiménez Leal, Venezuelan cuatro player, singer-songwriter
 Porfirio Jiménez, Dominican-born Venezuelan bandleader, arranger, songwriter

K–N 
 Luis Laguna, musician, songwriter
 José Ángel Lamas, classical composer
 Antonio Lauro, composer, guitarist
 Anselmo López, Venezuelan bandola performer
 Ángel Custodio Loyola, folk singer
 Natalia Luis-Bassa, classical conductor
 Pablo Manavello, Italian-born Venezuelan rock guitarist
 Mango, salsa music group
 Maracaibo 15, Venezuelan gaita group
 Floria Márquez, bolero singer

 Henry Martínez, songwriter
 Mayré Martínez, pop singer-songwriter
 Eduardo Marturet, classical conductor
 Francisco Mata, folk singer-songwriter
 Laudelino Mejías, composer
 Los Melódicos, dance band
 Conny Méndez, composer, singer, writer
 Armando Molero, singer-songwriter
 Moisés Moleiro, classical composer
 Silvano Monasterios, jazz pianist, composer
 Ricardo Montaner, singer-songwriter
 Gabriela Montero, pianist
 José Ángel Montero, opera composer
 Morella Muñoz, lyric mezzo-soprano
 Alberto Naranjo, arranger, conductor
 Graciela Naranjo, bolero singer, film actress

O–R 

 Orquesta Sinfónica Gran Mariscal de Ayacucho, symphony orchestra
 Orquesta Sinfónica Simón Bolívar, symphony orchestra
 Orquesta Sinfónica Venezuela, symphony orchestra
 Francisco Pacheco, folk singer
 Eneas Perdomo, joropo singer-songwriter
 Iván Pérez Rossi, Venezuelan cuatro player, singer, composer
 Allan Phillips, pop songwriter, producer
 Juan Bautista Plaza, classical composer
 Alí Primera, singer-songwriter
 Pancho Prin, folk singer-songwriter
 Edward Pulgar, classical violinist, conductor

 Ana María Raga, choral group conductor, composer, pianist
 Luis Felipe Ramón y Rivera, composer, performer, investigator, writer
 Victor Ramos Rangel, classical composer, bassoon player
 Rudy Regalado, Latin-jazz and pop bandleader, percussionist
 Fredy Reyna, Venezuelan cuatro player
 Rodrigo Riera, classical guitarist
 Rafael Rincón González, singer-songwriter
 Pedro Antonio Ríos Reyna, classical violinist
 María Rivas, jazz-pop singer-songwriter
 Luis Mariano Rivera, Venezuelan cuatro player, songwriter
 Aldemaro Romero, classical and pop composer, conductor, bandleader
 Alfredo Rugeles, composer, conductor
 Otmaro Ruíz, jazz and pop pianist, arranger, composer

S–Z 
 Alfredo Sadel, lyric tenor, pop singer, songwriter
 Rodolfo Saglimbeni, classical conductor
 Juan Carlos Salazar, Venezuelan cuatro player, singer-songwriter
 Magdalena Sánchez, joropo singer
 Chucho Sanoja, bandleader, arranger, pianist, songwriter
 José Enrique Sarabia, songwriter
 Ángel Sauce, classical composer, violinist, conductor
 Serenata Guayanesa, folk vocal and instrumental quartet
 Eduardo Serrano, songwriter, arranger, conductor, performer
 Vicente Emilio Sojo, classical composer, conductor, musicologist, educator
 Henry Stephen, pop singer
 Mario Suárez, pop-folk singer
 Los Terrícolas, pop-rock vocal and instrumental group
 Ricardo Teruel, composer
 Ender Thomas, pop singer-songwriter
 Todosantos, indie Latin-rock band
 Juan Vicente Torrealba, Venezuelan harp player, composer
 El Trabuco Venezolano, Latin-jazz salsa big band
 Lilia Vera, folk singer

 Verona, rock vocal and instrumental group
 Voz Veis, pop vocal sextet
 Franco de Vita, pop singer and composer
 Anaís Vivas (born 1989), pop singer
 Gerry Weil, Austrian-born Venezuelan jazz pianist
 Yordano, singer, composer 
 ZAPATO 3,  rock music vocal and instrumental group

Politicians

 Rómulo Betancourt (1908–1981), former president (1945–1948; 1959–1964) and founder of the Democratic Action party (AD, by its initials in Spanish)
 Juan Guaidó (born 1983), politician & political activist.
 Douglas Bravo (born 1923), former guerrilla leader and founder of the Venezuelan Revolution party (PRV, for its initials in Spanish)
 Rafael Caldera (1916–2009), former president (1969–1974; 1994–1999) and founder of the Social Christian party (Copei, by its initials in Spanish)
Rubén González Cárdenas (1875 –1939), lawyer  He became Secretary General for the Government; Minister of Public Instruction and Minister of Interior Relations
 Pedro Carmona (born 1941), former president (2002)
 Cipriano Castro (1858–1924), former president (1899–1908)
 Hugo Chávez (1954–2013), former president (1999–2013) and founder of the Fifth Republic Movement party (MVR, by its initials in Spanish)
 Joaquín Crespo (1841–1898), former president (1884–1886; 1892–1898)
 Juan Crisóstomo Falcón (1820–1870), former president (1863–1868)
 Rómulo Gallegos (1884–1969), former president (1948)
 Juan Vicente Gómez (1857–1935), former president (1908–1935)
 Antonio Guzmán Blanco (1829–1899), former president (1870–1877)
 Wolfgang Larrazábal (1911–2003), former president (1958–1959)
 Eleazar López Contreras (1883–1973), former president (1935–1941)
 Leopoldo López (born 1971), former mayor of the Chacao municipality (2000–2008)
 Nicolás Maduro (born 1962), president of Venezuela (2013–)
 Pompeyo Márquez (born 1922), former minister of borders (1994–1999) 
 Isaías Medina Angarita (1897–1953), former president (1941–1945)
 Fabricio Ojeda (1929–1966), former guerrilla fighter
 José Antonio Páez (1790–1873) former president (1830–1835; 1839–1843; 1861–1863)
 Dori Parra de Orellana (1923-2007), former governor and senator of Lara state
 Jacinta Parejo de Crespo (1845–1914), former First Lady of Venezuela (1884–1886; 1892–1898)
 Carlos Andrés Pérez (1922–2010), former president (1974–1979; 1989–1993)
 Marcos Pérez Jiménez (1914–2001), former president (1952–1958)
 Teodoro Petkoff (1932–2018), former guerrilla fighter and minister of the central office of coordination and planning (1996–1999)
 José Vicente Rangel (born 1929), former vice president (2002–2007) and minister of foreign affairs (1991–2001)
 Alí Rodríguez Araque (1937–2018), former ambassador to Cuba (2014-2018), minister of foreign affairs (2004-2006), minister of finance (2008-2010), and general secretary of OPEC (2000–2002)
 Irene Sáez (born 1961), former mayor of the Chacao municipality (1993–1998) and governor of Nueva Esparta (1999–2000)
 Juan Manuel Sucre Figarella (1925–1996), former minister of defense (1974–1975)
 Leopoldo Sucre Figarella (1926–1996), former governor of Bolívar (1958–1959) and minister of public works (1960–1969)
 Alirio Ugarte Pelayo (1923–1967), former governor of Monagas (1948-1951) and ambassador to Mexico (1959-1962)
 Guillermo Tell Villegas (1823–1907), former president (1868; 1870; 1892)
 Ramón José Velásquez (born 1916), former president (1993–1994)
 Jóvito Villalba (1908–1981), founder of the Democratic Republican Union party (URD, by its initials in Spanish)
Ezequiel Zamora (1817–1860), soldier, and leader of the Federalists in the Federal War

Science 
 Manuel Blum, winner of the Turing Award
 Freddy Cachazo, winner of the Breakthrough Prize in Fundamental Physics
 Humberto Fernández-Morán, researcher and founder of the Venezuelan Institute for Neurological and Brain Studies (now Venezuelan Institute for Scientific Research), who developed the diamond knife, winner of the John Scott Medal.
 Carlota Perez, technology scholar and economist
 William H. Phelps, ornithologist and founder of Radio Caracas Radio
 Aldemaro Romero Jr. (born 1951), scientist, communicator, advocate of liberal arts education

Medicine 
 Carlos Arvelo, military surgeon in the 19th century, and rector of the Central University of Venezuela from 1846 until 1849.
 Baruj Benacerraf, Venezuelan-born American, Nobel Prize of Medicine in 1980.
Sara Bendahan, the first Venezuelan woman to complete her medical degree in that country.
Maruja Clavier, was one of the first Venezuelan nuclear oncologists.
 Jacinto Convit, medic and scientist, known for developing a vaccine to fight leprosy and his studies to cure different types of cancer.
 Francisco De Venanzi, Venezuelan doctor, scientist, scholar, and rector of the Central University of Venezuela.
 José Del Vecchio, pioneered both sports medicine and youth baseball development.
 Arnoldo Gabaldón, pioneered in anti-malaria campaign.
 José Gregorio Hernández, physician and Catholic religious figure.
 Tobías Lasser, botanist, founder of the Botanic Garden of Caracas.
 Marcel Roche, physician and educator.
 José María Vargas, modernized the Medicine studies in Venezuela in the second half of the 19th century.

Sports

Baseball 
See also:
List of players from Venezuela in Major League Baseball
Venezuelan Baseball Hall of Fame and Museum

 Bobby Abreu
 José Altuve
 Ernesto Aparicio 
 Ronald Acuña Jr.
 Luis Aparicio
 Luis Aparicio, Sr.
 Antonio Armas
 Dámaso Blanco
 José 'Carrao' Bracho
 Alex Cabrera
 Miguel Cabrera
 Daniel 'Chino' Canónico
Giovanni Carrara
 Alejandro Carrasquel
 Alfonso 'Chico' Carrasquel
 José Antonio Casanova
 David Concepción
 Emilio Cueche
 Luis 'Camaleón' García
Francisco Cervelli
 Pompeyo Davalillo
 Víctor Davalillo
 Baudilio Diaz
 Dalmiro Finol
 Andrés Galarraga
 Oswaldo Guillén
 Félix Hernández
 Ramón Hernández
Luis Leal
 Vidal López
 Ramón Monzant
 Magglio Ordóñez
 Salvador Perez
 Chucho Ramos
 Wilson Ramos 
Luis Salazar
 Johan Santana
 Marco Scutaro
 Luis Sojo
Gleyber Torres
 César Tovar
 Manny Trillo
 Guillermo Vento
 Omar Vizquel
 Luis Zuloaga

Basketball 
John Cox
 Carl Herrera
 Donta Smith
 Óscar Torres
Gregory Vargas (born 1986)
 Greivis Vásquez

Bodybuilding 
 Fannie Barrios
 Yaxeni Oriquen-Garcia
 Betty Viana-Adkins

Boxing 
 Alfonso Blanco
Antonio Esparragoza
 Luis Estaba
Roberto Marcano
 Carlos Morocho Hernandez
 Betulio González
 Jorge Linares
 Alexander Muñoz
 Lorenzo Parra
 Edwin Valero

Bowling 
 Amleto Monacelli

Cycling 
 Hersony Canelon
 Stefany Hernández
 Daniela Larreal
 José Rujano
 Miguel Ubeto

Fencing 
Silvio Fernandez
 Francisco Limardo
 Rubén Limardo

Horse racing 
Junior Alvarado
 Gustavo Avila
 Abel Castellano, Jr.
 Javier Castellano
 Eibar Coa
 Ramón Domínguez
Emisael Jaramillo
Sonny Leon
Douglas Valiente

Motorcycle racing 
 Johnny Cecotto
 Carlos Lavado
 Iván Palazzese

Polo 
 Victor Vargas

Rugby 
 Serge Blanco

Soccer 
 Gilberto Angelucci
 Juan Arango
 Deyna Castellanos
 Roberto Cavallo
 Gabriel Cichero
 José Luis Dolgetta
 Wuilker Fariñez
 Vito Fassano
 Nicolas Fedor
 Juan Pablo Galavis
 Massimo Margiotta
 Josef Martínez
 Alejandro Moreno
 Daniel Nikolac
 Richard Páez
 Tomás Rincón
 Stalin Rivas
 Salomón Rondón
 Giovanni Savarese
 Jefferson Savarino
 Yeferson Soteldo
 Renny Vega
 José Vidal

Sports car racing 
 Johnny Cecotto
 Johnny Cecotto Jr.
 Pancho Pepe Cróquer
 Milka Duno
 Pastor Maldonado
 Enzo Potolicchio
 Alex Popow
 Ernesto José Viso

Swimming 
 María Elena Giusti
 Andreina Pinto
 Yanel Pinto
 Francisco Sanchez
Alberto Mestre
 Albert Subirats
 Rafael Vidal

Tennis 
 Jorge Andrew
 Juan Carlos Bianchi
 José de Armas
 Alfonso Mora
 Garbiñe Muguruza
 Gabriela Paz Franco
 Nicolás Pereira
Iyo Pimentel
 Maurice Ruah
 Milagros Sequera
 David Souto
 Roberto Maytín
 Jimy Szymanski
 Daniel Vallverdu
 María Vento-Kabchi

Track and field 
Benilde Ascanio
 Clive Bonas
Albert Bravo
Víctor Castillo
Daniel Cereali
Teófilo Davis Bell
 Arquimedes Herrera
Ahymara Espinoza
 Horacio Esteves
Brigido Iriarte
 Horacio Esteves
 Asnoldo Devonish
 Yoger Medina
 Erick Phillips
 Rafael Romero
Pachencho Romero
Hector Thomas
Lloyd Murad
Victor Maldonado
Robeilys Peinado
 José Peña
Néstor Nieves
Félix Mata
Rosa Rodríguez
 Yulimar Rojas
Gisela Vidal 
William Wuycke

References